Marc "Mags" Magliarditi (born July 9, 1976) is an American former professional ice hockey goaltender who most recently played for the Las Vegas Wranglers of the ECHL

Awards and honours

External links

1976 births
American men's ice hockey goaltenders
Chicago Blackhawks draft picks
Cincinnati Cyclones (IHL) players
Cleveland Barons (2001–2006) players
Columbus Chill players
Des Moines Buccaneers players
Detroit Vipers players
Flint Generals players
Florida Everblades players
Fort Wayne Komets players
Ice hockey players from New York (state)
Indianapolis Ice players
Las Vegas Wranglers players
Living people
Louisiana IceGators (ECHL) players
Red Deer Rebels players
Richmond Renegades players
Spokane Chiefs players
Sportspeople from Niagara Falls, New York
Western Michigan Broncos men's ice hockey players
AHCA Division I men's ice hockey All-Americans